SR-19 may refer to:

A synthetic cannabinoid also known as BTM-4
State Route 19